is a Japanese figure skater. He is the  2022 Japanese national silver medalist, 2019 Bavarian Open senior champion and the 2018–19 Junior Grand Prix Final bronze medalist. He has won three other medals on the ISU Junior Grand Prix series (silver at the 2018 JGP Austria, bronze at the 2016 JGP France and 2018 JGP Slovenia). He placed 14th at the 2017 World Junior Championships and is a two-time Japan Junior national medalist.

Personal life 
Koshiro Shimada was born in Ehime Prefecture, Japan.

Career 
Shimada began learning to skate as a six-year-old. He moved to Okayama with his mother to advance his training.

Shimada's junior international debut came in the 2015–16 season. Competing on the ISU Junior Grand Prix (JGP) circuit, he placed 7th in Bratislava, Slovakia, and 5th in Zagreb, Croatia. Ranked fourth at the Japan Junior Championships, he was assigned to the 2016 Winter Youth Olympics in Hamar, Norway, where he finished 6th.

During the 2016–17 JGP series, Shimada won the bronze medal in Saint Gervais-les-Bains, France, and placed fourth in Tallinn, Estonia. He took the silver medal at the Japan Junior Championships in November 2016 and placed 7th as a senior at the Japan Championships. At the 2017 World Junior Championships in Taipei, he placed 12th in the short program, 13th in the free skate, and 14th overall.

In 2017, Shimada started training with Stéphane Lambiel in Champéry, Switzerland.

2019–2020 season, Shimada moved to the senior level.

2022–2023 season 
Starting the season at the 2022 CS Lombardia Trophy, Shimada won the silver medal. He was given two Grand Prix assignments, coming ninth at the 2022 Skate America and fourth at the 2022 MK John Wilson Trophy.

Shimada unexpectedly finished in second place at the 2022–23 Japan Championships, despite a "shaky" landing on his attempted quad Salchow. He was only sixth in the free skate, struggling with a number of jumps, but he remained second overall, less than two points ahead of bronze medalist Kazuki Tomono. Despite being the national silver medalist, the Japan Skating Federation's selection criteria for the 2023 World Championships led to his not being named to one of Japan's three berths, which drew protest from Shimada's friend and training partner, Japanese national champion Shoma Uno. Shimada was instead assigned to compete at the 2023 Four Continents Championships, where he came eleventh.

Programs

Competitive highlights 
GP: Grand Prix; CS: Challenger Series; JGP: Junior Grand Prix

2015–16 season to present

Earlier career

Detailed results 
Current personal best scores are highlighted in bold.

Senior level

Junior level

References

External links 
 

2001 births
Living people
Japanese male single skaters
Figure skaters at the 2016 Winter Youth Olympics
People from Matsuyama, Ehime